Thorley Swinstead Walters (12 May 1913 – 6 July 1991) was an English character actor. He is probably best remembered for his comedy film roles such as in Two-Way Stretch and Carlton-Browne of the FO.

Early life
Walters was born in Teigngrace, Devon, the son of Prebendary Thomas Collins Walters of Silverton, Devon and his wife Mary  née Swinstead.  He was educated at Monkton Combe School, Somerset.

Walters appeared in the West End in the 1942 naval play Escort by Patrick Hastings and the 1949 musical Her Excellency at the London Hippodrome.

Career

Films
He featured in three of the St Trinian's films, starting as an army major in Blue Murder at St Trinian's. He later appeared as Butters, assistant to Education Ministry senior civil servant Culpepper-Brown (Eric Barker) in The Pure Hell of St Trinian's and played the part of Culpepper-Brown in The Wildcats of St Trinian's.

From the 1960s onwards he also appeared in several Hammer horror films, including The Phantom of the Opera (1962), Dracula: Prince of Darkness (1966), Frankenstein Created Woman (1967), Frankenstein Must Be Destroyed (1969) and Vampire Circus (1972). He was a close friend of Hammer's most important director Terence Fisher.

Walters played Sherlock Holmes's sidekick Doctor Watson in four unrelated films: Sherlock Holmes and the Deadly Necklace (1962), The Best House in London (1969), The Adventure of Sherlock Holmes' Smarter Brother (1975) and Silver Blaze (1977).

Television
Walters' television appearances included the Granada series Crown Court, both as a judge and as a barrister. He also appeared as a barrister in the BBC Series A P Herbert's Misleading Cases starring Roy Dotrice as Albert Haddock. He also was in The Avengers starring as Hemming in the 1966 episode "What the Butler Saw". Walters also had roles in The Lotus Eaters and Tinker Tailor Soldier Spy. Walters was considered for the role of Captain Mainwaring in Dad's Army, before the part was assigned to Arthur Lowe – Walters was offered the role by producer David Croft but turned it down.  In 1974 he played the Prince of Wales in the TV drama Jennie - Lady Randolph Churchill.

Personal life
In the DVD commentary to The Man Who Haunted Himself, actor Roger Moore mentioned that co-star Walters lived in Dolphin Square in Pimlico, London in which some scenes of the film were shot.

Walters visited the ailing Terry-Thomas in Barnes, London in 1989. Walters had starred with Thomas in the Boulting Brothers' film Carlton-Browne of the F.O. and was shocked at his appearance (he was ill with Parkinson's disease). That visit resulted in the Terry-Thomas Gala held in the Theatre Royal, Drury Lane in the same year which raised funds to help Thomas live the rest of his life in comfort.

Actress Siobhan Redmond was visiting Walters when he died in a London nursing home. Actor Ian Bannen gave the main address at his funeral held at Golders Green.

Filmography

 The Love Test (1935) - Chemist
 Once in a New Moon (1935)
 Life of St. Paul (1938) - Unidentified role
 Trunk Crime (1939) - Huey Frazer
 Secret Journey (1939) – Max von Reimer
 It Happened to One Man (1940) – Ronnie
 Medal for the General (1944) – Andrew
 They Were Sisters (1945) – Channing
 Waltz Time (1945) – Stefan Ravenne
 Captain Boycott (1947) – Army Officer (uncredited)
 Josephine and Men (1955) – Salesman
 Private's Progress (1956) – Captain Bootle
 Who Done It? (1956) – Raymond Courtney
 The Baby and the Battleship (1956) – Lt. Setley
 You Can't Escape (1956) – Chadwick
 The Passionate Stranger (1957) – Jimmy
 Second Fiddle (1957) – Charles
 The Truth About Women (1957) – Trevor
 The Birthday Present (1957) – Photographer
 Blue Murder at St Trinian's (1957) – Major
 Happy Is the Bride (1958) – Jim
 A Lady Mislaid (1958) – Smith
 Carlton-Browne of the F.O. (1959) – Colonel Bellingham of the Bays
 Don't Panic Chaps! (1959) – Brown
 Two-Way Stretch (1960) – Col. Parkright
 A French Mistress (1960) – Colonel Edmonds – Chairman of the Governors
 Suspect (1960) – Special Agent Prince
 The Pure Hell of St Trinian's (1960) – Butters
 Invasion Quartet (1961) – Cummings
 Murder, She Said (1961) – Cedric
 Petticoat Pirates (1961) – Captain Jerome Robertson
 The Phantom of the Opera (1962) – Lattimer
 Sherlock Holmes and the Deadly Necklace (1962) – Dr. Watson
 Heavens Above! (1963) – Tranquilax Executive
 Ring of Spies (1964) – Cmdr. Winters
 The Earth Dies Screaming (1964) – Edgar Otis
 Joey Boy (1965) – Col. Grant
 A Home of Your Own (1965) – Estate agent
 Rotten to the Core (1965) – Chief Constable Preston
 Dracula: Prince of Darkness (1966) – Ludwig
 The Psychopath (1966) – Martin Roth
 The Wrong Box (1966) – Lawyer Patience
 The Family Way (1966) – The Vicar
 Frankenstein Created Woman (1967) – Doctor Hertz
 Twisted Nerve (1968) – Sir John Forrester
 Crooks and Coronets (1969) – Hubbard
 Oh! What a Lovely War (1969) – Staff Officer in Ballroom
 The Last Shot You Hear (1969) – Gen. Jowett
 Frankenstein Must Be Destroyed (1969) – Inspector Frisch
 The Best House in London (1969) – Doctor Watson (uncredited)
 The Man Who Haunted Himself (1970) – Frank Bellamy
 Trog (1970) – Magistrate
 Bartleby (1970) – The Colleague
 There's a Girl in My Soup (1970) – Manager, Carlton Hotel
 Mr. Forbush and the Penguins (1971) – Mr. Forbush Sr.
 The Lotus Eaters (1972) – Major Edward Woolley
 Vampire Circus (1972) – Burgermeister
 Young Winston (1972) – Major Finn
 The Edwardians (1972) - King Edward VII
 Soft Beds, Hard Battles (1974) – General Erhardt
 The Gathering Storm (1974) – Stanley Baldwin
 The Adventure of Sherlock Holmes' Smarter Brother (1975) – Dr. Watson
 The People That Time Forgot (1977) – Norfolk
 The Wildcats of St Trinian's (1980) – Hugo Culpepper Brown
 The Sign of Four (1983) – Major John Sholto
 The Little Drummer Girl (1984) – Ned Quilley
 The Play on One: The Dunroamin' Rising (1988) – Mr Finister

References

External links
 

1913 births
1991 deaths
People educated at Monkton Combe School
English male stage actors
English male film actors
English male television actors
People from Teignbridge (district)
Male actors from Devon
20th-century English male actors